Hazan Gemici (15 June 1927 – 25 June 2001) was a Turkish sports wrestler and trainer, who won the gold medal in the flyweight class of men's freestyle wrestling at the 1952 Olympics.

He was born in Giresun and died in İzmit, Kocaeli Province of Turkey.

Gemici began wrestling 1949 in İzmit (Kocaeli). He won the gold medal at the 1951 Mediterranean Games in Alexandria, Egypt, before he became Olympic gold medalist in Helsinki, Finland the next year. After retiring from the active sports in 1955, he served as a trainer in his hometown İzmit and later in Romania.

Hasan Gemici died on 25 June 2001 at his home in Izmit following chronic renal failure. He was succeeded by his wife Nezahat Gemici and five children. A sports hall in İzmit is named after him.

Achievements
 1951 Mediterranean Games in Alexandria, Egypt - gold (Freestyle Flyweight)
 1952 Summer Olympics in Helsinki, Finland - gold (Freestyle Flyweight)

Notes

References
 Olympics Database
 Wrestling File 
 Newspaper Hürriyet 25 June 2001

External links
 

1927 births
2001 deaths
Sportspeople from Giresun
Olympic wrestlers of Turkey
Wrestlers at the 1952 Summer Olympics
Turkish male sport wrestlers
Olympic gold medalists for Turkey
Kabataş Erkek Lisesi alumni
Olympic medalists in wrestling
Medalists at the 1952 Summer Olympics

Mediterranean Games gold medalists for Turkey
Wrestlers at the 1951 Mediterranean Games
Mediterranean Games medalists in wrestling
20th-century Turkish people